Porto Esperidião is a municipality in the state of Mato Grosso in the Central-West Region of Brazil.

The municipality contains 27% of the  Serra de Santa Bárbara State Park, created in 1997.

See also
List of municipalities in Mato Grosso

References

Municipalities in Mato Grosso